Allari Premikudu is a 1994 Indian Telugu-language musical romance film produced by Suresh and Satyanand under the Sri Satya Durga Arts banner and directed by K. Raghavendra Rao. It stars Jagapati Babu, Soundarya, Rambha and Kanchan, while Ramya Krishna appears in a cameo appearance. Srihari, Rami Reddy, Brahmanandam, and Sudhakar play supporting roles The music is composed by M. M. Keeravani. This film is loosely inspired from the 1989 American film Worth Winning. The film was dubbed into Tamil as Pokkiri Kaadhalan.

Plot 
The film begins with Krishna Murthy / Kittu a famous Sitar player with and risk appetite for bets for easy money. Pandem Chandrendra Rao Naidu / Chandram always challenges him with the guidance of his elder bro Hari. Once, he bets Kittu for 3 lakhs that he should make 3 arduous girls Bhavani, Jhansi, & Jogeshwari Devi fall in his love. Bhavani is a student who hates men and fights for the welfare of women. Whereas Jhansi is an audacious police officer who neglects to wed. Plus, Jogeshwari Devi is an ascetic who has been forcibly turned into the form by vicious Bhairavaiah for the gravy train. Now Kittu takes up the venture. 

Firstly, he targets Bhavani by posing himself as a social worker. As well as he counterfeits his sidekick Ahobilam into a goon Khan Dada when she fell in love. The next, Kittu schemes, kidnaps Jhansi’s kid brother Jakki via a goon and pretends to save him. But the boy gazes at the fact when he sees Kittu giving money to the goon and apprises his sister. So, Kittu is prisoned when he announces his love and Jhansi battered him. Later, she regrets and dears him. Lastly, Kittu approaches Jogeswari Devi and allures her with his words when she too loves him. After a while, Bhavani overhears the conversation between Kittu & Ahobilam and understands how they have fooled her. She becomes furious and hires a goon Malli to hit Kittu. Anyhow, the scene opposes when Malli attempts to molest Bhavani and is safeguarded by Kittu when she asks apology. 

Ultimately, the day arrives, and Kittu declares to Chandram that he has succeeded in the mission when he asks to prove it. Hence, Kittu calls the 3 to Golkonda at different times. Here, he states the girls sculpt their names along with his on the walls of tombs and proclaim their love. Bhavani & Jhansi accomplishes the task and moves on. In Devi’s turn, she has been shot by Bhairavaiah & Hari and she expresses her love before leaving the breath. Kittu absconds as he is incriminated and Jhansi is assigned to investigate the crime. Bhairavaiah shows the names on walls as pieces of evidence when Jhani misconstrues Kittu as debauchery and hunts him. Simultaneously, Kittu goes to Chandram to vindicate himself where he discovers Hari & Bhairavaiah as the true homicides and onslaughts on them. Jhansi lands there and Kittu escapes to Bhavani's home who hides him believing in his morality. Thenceforth, Kittu proceeds to a hospital. Through Ahobilam Jhansi learns the whereabouts of Kittu she too reaches that place and Bhavani back her. 

On the spot, Jhansi inculpates Kittu and questions his motive for these love dramas. Then, as a flabbergast, he asserts himself as a married guy, the father of a baby also, and moves rearward. Kittu used to adore a girl Swapna granddaughter of millionaire Gajapati who opposes it because of status-barrier. Swapna quits the house, and nuptials Kittu who leads a delightful life and becomes pregnant. Hari & Chandram are cousins of Swapna that aspires to grab her property. So, he ruses assault Swapna with his men and she dies giving birth to a mentally unstable baby. Currently, Kittu affirms to Jhansi & Bhavani that he has accepted this bet to secure his terminally-ill daughter. It seems Hari is the one who instigated Chandram and ployed this play. Since Gajapati endorsed the entire property to Swapna and her progeny before his death. Forthwith, Hari & Bhairavaiah abduct the baby and seek to kill her. At last, Kittu rescues and recovers his child by ceasing the baddies. Finally, the movie ends on a happy note with Kittu fusing with the two.

Cast 

 Jagapati Babu as Krishna "Kittu" Moorti
 Ramya Krishna as Swapna
 Soundarya as Jhansi
 Rambha as Bhavani
 Kanchan as Jogeswari Devi
 Satyanarayana as Gajapati
 Srihari as Hari
 Rami Reddy as Bhairavaiah
 Brahmanandam as Ahobilam/Khan Dada
 Sudhakar as Chandram alias Pandem Chandredra Rao
 AVS as Chandram's assistant
 Dharmavarapu Subrahmanyam as Bhavani's father
 Nirmalamma as Lakshmi Devi
 Mada Venkateswara Rao as the Chief Minister of Andhra Pradesh
 Narsing Yadav as Goon
 Chidatala Appa Rao as Hotel Manager
 Kamalakar as College Student
 Ramana Murthy as Constable
 Bangalore Padma as Devi's maid

Soundtrack 

The music was composed by M. M. Keeravani. The music was released on Akash Audio Company.

Production 
First, only three heroines were included in the story, but later the role of Swapna was included. Divya Bharti & Meena were selected for two female roles respectively. But Bharti's death and Meena's unavailability led to the casting of Soundarya and Rambha. K. Raghavendra Rao wanted to cast Kamal Haasan for the lead role, but as it has multi heroines, Raghavendra Rao convinced himself that Jagapati Babu was suitable for the role. It was a big budget film of that time.

References

External links 

1994 films
1990s Telugu-language films
Indian romantic drama films
Indian romantic musical films
Indian films about gambling
1990s romantic drama films
1990s romantic musical films
Films directed by K. Raghavendra Rao
Films scored by M. M. Keeravani
Films shot in Hyderabad, India
1990s musical comedy-drama films
Indian musical comedy-drama films
1994 comedy films
1994 drama films